Natal de Carvalho Baroni, commonly known as Natal (born November 24, 1945), is a retired Brazilian football midfielder. He was born in Belo Horizonte. He is known for having played for Cruzeiro, where he won five straight Campeonato Mineiros, and for having played 14 times for the Brazil national team, scoring three goals.

Natal made 89 appearances and scored 11 goals in the Campeonato Brasileiro.

Career 
Cruzeiro-MG: 1964-1971 (Brazil)
Corinthians-SP: 1971-1972 (Brazil)
Bahia-BA (Brazil)
Vitória-BA (Brazil)
América-MG (Brazil)
Londrina-PR (Brazil)
Vila Nova-MG (Brazil)
Caldense-MG (Brazil)
Democrata de Governador Valadares-MG (Brazil)
Valeriodoce-MG (Brazil)
Deportivo Italia (Venezuela)

Achievements 
Campeonato Mineiro: 1965, 1966, 1967, 1968, 1969  (Cruzeiro)

References

1945 births
Living people
Brazilian footballers
Brazil international footballers
América Futebol Clube (MG) players
Esporte Clube Bahia players
Sport Club Corinthians Paulista players
Cruzeiro Esporte Clube players
Esporte Clube Democrata players
Londrina Esporte Clube players
Vila Nova Futebol Clube players
Esporte Clube Vitória players
Deportivo Italia players
Association football midfielders
Footballers from Belo Horizonte